The Aranyakas are a part of the ancient Indian Vedas concerned with the meaning of ritual sacrifice. They typically represent the later sections of the Vedas, and are one of many layers of Vedic texts. The other parts of the Vedas are the Samhitas (benedictions, hymns), Brahmanas (commentary), and the Upanishads (spirituality and abstract philosophy).

Aranyakas describe and discuss rituals from various perspectives; some include philosophical speculations. For example, the Katha Aranyaka discusses rituals connected with the Pravargya. The Aitareya Aranyaka includes explanation of the Mahavrata ritual from ritualisitic to symbolic meta-ritualistic points of view. Aranyakas, however, neither are homogeneous in content nor in structure. Aranyakas are sometimes identified as karma-kanda (कर्मकाण्ड), ritualistic action/sacrifice section, while the Upanishads are identified as jnana-kanda (ज्ञानकाण्ड) knowledge/spirituality section. In an alternate classification, the early part of Vedas are called Samhitas and the ritualistic commentary on the mantras and rituals are called the Brahmanas which together are identified as the ceremonial karma-kanda, while Aranyakas and Upanishads are referred to as the jnana-kanda.

In the immense volume of ancient Indian Vedic literature, there is no absolute universally true distinction between Aranyakas and Brahmanas. Similarly, there is no absolute distinction between Aranyakas and Upanishads, as some Upanishads are incorporated inside a few Aranyakas. Aranyakas, along with Brahmanas, represent the emerging transitions in later Vedic religious practices. The transition completes with the blossoming of ancient Indian philosophy from external sacrificial rituals to internalized philosophical treatise of Upanishads.

Etymology
"Aranyaka" literally means "produced, born, relating to a forest " or rather, "belonging to the wilderness". It is derived from the word  (अरण्य), which means "wilderness".

Several theories have been proposed on the origin of the word Aranyaka. Originally, as per Oldenberg (1915), it meant dangerous texts to be studied in the wilderness (Taitt. Ar. II). A later, post-Vedic  theory holds that these texts were meant to be studied in a forest, while the other holds that the name came from these being the manuals of allegorical interpretation of sacrifices, for those in Vanaprastha (retired, forest-dwelling) stage of their life, however the Vanaprastha Ashrama came into existence only well after that of the Sanyasin (Sprockhoff 1976), according to the historic age-based Ashrama system of human life.
Four Ashrams consist of Brhmacharya up to 25 years for learning and grooming for life; Gruhastha from 26 to 50 years for marriage and worldly activities; Vanaprastha from 51 to 75 when person/couple retire from active family/social life and devote time in religious, philosophical pursuit. It is so named after Vana-Forest life by moving to the forest. From 75 till end of life person lives life of an ascetic, contemplating on supernatural, pure philosophy, accepting whatever is available for sustaining the life. It is mostly in helping the society in whatever manner possible, giving benefit of long experience and knowledge accumulated during the lifetime.

Taittiriya Ar. 2 says, "from where one cannot see the roofs of the settlement", which does not indicate a forested area.

Discussion

Structure
Aranyakas are diverse in their structure. Jan Gonda summarizes:

Many Aranyaka texts enumerate mantras, identifications, etymologies, discussions, myths and symbolic interpretations, but a few such as by sage Arunaketu include hymns with deeper philosophical insights.

Contents
The Aranyakas discuss sacrifices, in the language and style of the Brahmanas, and thus are primarily concerned with the proper performance of ritual (orthopraxy). The Aranyakas were restricted to a particular class of rituals that nevertheless were frequently included in the Vedic curriculum.

The Aranyakas are associated with, and named for, individual Vedic shakhas.
Rigveda
Aitareya Aranyaka belongs to the Aitareya Shakha of Rigveda
Kaushitaki Aranyaka belongs to the Kaushitaki and Shankhayana Shakhas of Rigveda
Yajurveda
Taittiriya Aranyaka belongs to the Taittiriya Shakha of the Krishna Yajurveda
Maitrayaniya Aranyaka belongs to the Maitrayaniya Shakha of the Krishna Yajurveda
Katha Aranyaka belongs to the (Caraka)Katha Shakha of the Krishna Yajurveda
Brihad Aranyaka in the Madhyandina and the Kanva  versions of the Shukla Yajurveda. The Madhyandina version has 9 sections, of which the last 6 are the Brihadaranyaka Upanishad.
Samaveda
Talavakara Aranyaka or Jaiminiya Upanishad Brahmana belongs to the Talavakara or Jaiminiya Shakha of the Samaveda
Aranyaka Samhita is not a typical Aranyaka text: rather the Purvarchika of the Samaveda Samhitas has a section of mantras, called the 'Aranyaka Samhita', on which the Aranyagana Samans are sung.
The Atharvaveda has no surviving Aranyaka, though the Gopatha Brahmana is regarded as its Aranyaka, a remnant of a larger, lost Atharva (Paippalada) Brahmana.

Aitareya Aranyaka 

There are five chapters each of which is even considered as a full Aranyaka. The first one deals with the regimen known as ‘Mahaa-vrata’. The explanations are both ritualistic as well as speculative. The second one has six chapters of which the first three are about ‘Praana-vidyaa’ – meaning, Prana, the Vital Air that constitutes the life-breath of a living body is also the life-breath of all mantras, all vedas and all vedic declarations (cf. 2.2.2 of Aitareya Aranyaka). It is in this portion of the Aranyaka that one finds specific statements about how one who follows the vedic injunctions and performs the sacrifices goes to become the God of Fire, or the Sun or Air and how one who transgresses the Vedic prescriptions is born into lower levels of being, namely, as birds and reptiles.

The 4th, 5th and 6th chapters of this second Aranyaka constitute what is known as Aitareya Upanishad.

The third Aranyaka in this chain of Aranyakas is also known as ‘Samhitopanishad’. This elaborates on the various ways – like pada-paatha, krama-paatha, etc. – of reciting the Vedas and the nuances of the ‘svaras’.

The fourth and the fifth Aranyaka are technical and dwell respectively on the mantras known as ‘MahaanaamnI’ and the yajna known as ‘Madhyandina’.

Taittiriya Aranyaka 

There are ten chapters, of which, one to six form the Aranyaka proper.  The first two chapters are part of the aṣṭau kāṭhakāni (the "8 Kathaka sections"), which were not native to the tradition of the Taittiriya shakha. They were adopted from the Kāṭhaka shakha, and mostly deal with varieties of the Agnicayana ritual and with Vedic study.

Chapter 1, is a very late Vedic chapter, which even has some Puranic names; it is usually called the Āruṇa praśna for the particular styleof fire-brick piling dealt with in the text.  It is also referred to as the "Surya namaskara chapter" by South Indian Brahmins who have created a ritual of reciting it with surya namaskara exercises after each of its 132 anuvakas. Parts of the Kaṭha version of this section has been published by L. v. Schroeder in 1898.
 
Chapter 2, discusses the five Mahā-yajñas that every Brahmin has to do daily, most importantly the daily recitation of the Veda (svādhyāya). Further, the sacred thread, the yajñopavīta, sāndhyā worship, that of the ancestors (pitṛ), the brahma-yajña, and the cleansing homa-sacrifice ('kūṣmāṇḍa-homa') are all treated in detail. – In this chapter the word 'shramana' is used (2-7-1) in the meaning of an ascetic (tapasvin); this word was later used also for the Buddhist and Jain ascetics. – Discussed and translated by Ch. Malamoud (in French, 1977); the Kaṭha version of this section has been published by L. v. Schroeder in 1898.

Chapter 3, treats technicalities of several other homas and yajnas.

Chapter 4, provides the mantras used in the pravargya Shrauta ritual that is considered to be dangerous as it involves heating a specially prepared clay vessel full of milk until it is glowing red. 
It is fairly close to the Kaṭha version.

Chapter 5, treats the Pravargya-yajña in prose discussion (brāhmaṇa style). 
Again, it is fairly close to the Kaṭha version.

Chapter 6, records the ‘pitṛmedha’ mantras, recited during the rituals for the disposal of the dead body.

Chapters 7, 8 and 9, are the three vallis of the well-known Taittiriya Upanishad.

Chapter 10, is also known as the "Mahanarayana Upanishad". It has several important mantras culled from the three Samhitas. TA 10.41–44 is known as the "Medha sukta".

Katha Aranyaka
The Katha Aranyaka is fairly parallel to the text of the Taittiriyas. It has been preserved, somewhat fragmentarily, in just one Kashmiri birchbark manuscript. It has recently been edited and translated,; cf. the early uncritical print by L. von Schroeder

Kaushitaki Āranyaka 
It is also known as Shankhyayana Aranyaka. There are fifteen chapters:

Chapters 1–2 deal with the Mahavrata.

Chapters 3–6 constitute the Kaushitaki Upanishad.

Chapters 7–8 are known as a Samhitopanishad.

Chapter 9 presents the greatness of Prana.

Chapter 10 deals with the esoteric implications of the Agnihotra ritual. All divine personalities are inherent in the Purusha, just as Agni in speech, Vayu in Prana, the Sun in the eyes, the Moon in the mind, the directions in the ears and water in the potency. The one who knows this, says the Aranyaka, and in the strength of that conviction goes about eating, walking, taking and giving, satisfies all the gods and what he offers in the fire reaches those gods in heaven. (cf.10-1).

Chapter 11 prescribes several antidotes in the form of rituals for warding off death and sickness. It also details the effects of dreams.
 
Chapter 12 elaborates the fruits of prayer.

Chapter 13 treats more philosophical matters and says one must first attitudinally discard one's bodily attachment and then carry on the ‘shravana’, manana and nidhidhyasana and practise all the disciplines of penance, faith, self-control etc.

Chapter 14 gives just two mantras. One extols the “I am Brahman” mantra and says it is the apex of all Vedic mantras. The second mantra declares that one who does not get the meaning of mantras but only recites vedic chants is like an animal which does not know the value of the weight it carries.

Chapter 15 gives a long genealogy of spiritual teachers from Brahma down to Guna-Sankhayana.

Brihad-Aranyaka 

The Aranyaka of the Shukla Yajurveda is part of its Brahmana: Satapatha Br. 14,1–3 in the Madhyandina version. Like the Taittiriya and Katha Aranyakas it exclusively deals with the Parvargya ritual, and is followed by the Brihad-Aranyaka Upanishad (Satapatha Br. 14.4–9).

Rahasya Brahmanas 
There is also a certain continuity of the Aranyakas from the Brahmanas in the sense that the Aranyakas go into the meanings of the 'secret' rituals not detailed in the Brahmanas. Later tradition sees this as a leap into subtlety that provides the reason for Durgacharya in his commentary on the Nirukta to say that the Aranyakas are ‘Rahasya Brahmana’, that is, the Brahmana of secrets.

See also 
Brihad-Aranyaka Upanishad

Notes

Sources

References 
 Vaidik Sahitya aur Samskriti ka swarup (in Hindi) by Om Prakash Pande. Vishwa Prakashan (A unit of Wylie Eastern) 1994, New Delhi .
 Aitareya Aranyaka – English Translation by A. B. Keith, London 1909
 Arthur Berriedale Keith, The Aitareya Aranyaka: Edited from the manuscripts in the India Office and the Library of the Royal Asiatic Society with introduction, translation, notes, ... unpublished of the Sankhayana Aranyaka,  Eastern Book Linkers (1995) 
 Aitareya Aranyaka – A Study . Dr. Suman Sharma. Eastern Book Linkers. New Delhi 1981
 Taittiriya Aranyaka, with Sayana Bhashya . Anandashram, Pune 1926.
 B.D. Dhawan. Mysticism and Symbolism in Aitareya and Taittiriya Aranyakas, South Asia Books (1989), 
 Charles Malamoud, Svādhyāya : récitation personelle du Veda Taittirīya-Āranyaka livre II : texte; traduit et commenté par Charles Malamoud. Paris : Institut de civilisation indienne, 1977
 Houben, Jan. The Pravargya Brāhmaṇa of the Taittirīya Āraṇyaka : an ancient commentary on the Pravargya ritual; introduction, translation, and notes by Jan E.M. Houben. Delhi : Motilal Banarsidass Publishers, 1991.
 Michael Witzel, Katha Aranyaka : Critical Edition with a Translation into German and an Introduction, Harvard Oriental Series,   Harvard Department of Sanskrit and Indian Studies (2005)  (in German)
 Bhagyalata A. Pataskar, The Kaṭhakāraṇyakam (With text in Devanāgarī, Introduction and translation. New Delhi: Adarsha Sanskrit Shodha Samstha / Vaidika Samshodhana Mandala, 2009.

Further reading
 Jan Gonda (1975), A History of Indian Literature: Volume 1, Vedic Literature: Saṃhitās and Brāhmaṇas, Otto Harrassowitz Verlag, "Chapter IX: The Āraṇyakas".

External links

Vedic Hinduism Jamison and Witzel (1992), Harvard University (Discusses Vedic literature (including Aranyakas), its history, timeline, diversity and difficulty in translations, and the variation in versions of discovered manuscripts in different parts of India)

Hindu texts